Robert J. Shelley (born July 27, 1941) is an American attorney and former politician in the state of Florida.

Shelley was born in New York City. He came to Florida in 1969 and attended Broward Community College. He is a former fireman and fire chief. He served in the Florida House of Representatives from 1983 to 1990, as a Republican, representing the 92nd district.

References

Living people
1941 births
Republican Party members of the Florida House of Representatives